The GB-1, also known as the "Grapefruit bomb" and as XM-108, was a glide bomb produced by Aeronca Aircraft for the United States Army Air Forces during World War II. Intended to allow bombers to release bombs from outside the range of enemy defenses, over one thousand GB-1s were used in combat before the end of the war.

Design and development
The U.S. Army Air Corps – which would later become the U.S. Army Air Forces – initiated development of a glide bomb design in March 1941.  Intended to allow bombers to stand off outside the range of enemy flak while releasing their bombload, while also potentially allowing for more precise targeting due to the shallow glide path the bomb would follow, the design resulted in three prototypes; one developed by Aeronca designated GB-1; a design by Bellanca designated GB-2, and the Timm Aircraft-designed GB-3.

The GB-1 mated a  wing and twin-tail empennage of conventional small-aircraft design to a standard M34  bomb.

Operational history
Selected for production over the competing GB-2 and GB-3 due to its simpler control system and its proving more practical for bomber carriage, production of the GB-1 began in May 1943; arriving in the combat zone in September, operational use was delayed due to the limited bombload the glider imposed – a B-17 Flying Fortress bomber could carry only two GB-1s on a mission, one on a rack under each of the bomber's wings – and the accuracy of the GB-1 proving to be significantly worse than that of ordinary bombs. Despite this, by May 1944 the first releases of GB-1s were undertaken. German gunners mistook the bombs for aircraft they were shooting down, claiming over 90 kills. Due to the inaccuracy the bombs demonstrated, the Eighth Air Force did not use the glide bombs again; however other units would go on to use over a thousand GB-1s before the end of the war.

During the war, variants of the GB-1 using a contrast seeker for anti-shipping use (GB-5, GB-12), heat seeking (GB-6), semi-active radar homing (GB-7), radio command guidance (GB-8), television guidance (GB-10), a flare seeker (GB-13), and active radar homing (GB-14) were developed, however none progressed beyond the testing stage. A version for use in dispersing chemical agents, the GB-11, was also trialled but cancelled due to the end of the war; the GT-1 torpedo-delivering glider was also derived from the GB-1.

Production of the GB-1 was terminated in January 1945; following the end of the war, the bomb was taken out of service.

References

Citations

Bibliography

External links

World War II guided missiles of the United States
Guided bombs of the United States
Weapons and ammunition introduced in 1943